Nipissing is a provincial electoral district in the Canadian province of Ontario, which elects one member to the Legislative Assembly of Ontario. It is located in the northeastern part of Ontario, centred on the city of North Bay.

History
The district was first contested in the 1890 election, but was divided into the separate districts of Nipissing East and Nipissing West for the 1902 election. By 1908, however, demographic changes resulted in Nipissing West being divided into two new districts, Sudbury and Sturgeon Falls, and the single riding of Nipissing was thus reconstituted and has been represented consistently in the Legislative Assembly ever since.

In 1996, Ontario was divided into the same electoral districts as those used for federal electoral purposes. They were redistributed whenever a readjustment took place at the federal level.

In 2005, legislation was passed by the Legislature to divide Ontario into 107 electoral districts, beginning with the provincial election in 2007. The eleven northern electoral districts are those defined for federal purposes in 1996, based on the 1991 census (except for a minor boundary adjustment). The 96 southern electoral districts are those defined for federal electoral purposes in 2003, based on the 2001 census. Without this legislation, the number of electoral districts in northern Ontario would have been reduced from eleven to ten.

In 1996, it was defined to consist of parts of the eastern part of territorial district of Parry Sound, and the western part of the Territorial District of Nipissing.

The federal electoral district was abolished in 2003 when it was merged into Nipissing—Timiskaming riding.

Members of Provincial Parliament

Election results

		

	

|align="left" colspan=2|Liberal hold  
|align="right"|Swing
|align="right"|  -3.47
|

^ Changed based on redistributed results

2007 electoral reform referendum

Notes

Sources
 Elections Ontario
1999 results
2003 results
2007 results
Map of riding for 2018 election

Ontario provincial electoral districts
Politics of North Bay, Ontario